Gergana Stoyanova Baramova (born 9 December 1989) is a Bulgarian female badminton player. She is profoundly deaf and has mainly competed at the Deaflympics and World Deaf Badminton Championships.

Gergana made her Deaflympic debut at the 2005 Summer Deaflympics which was held in Melbourne. She then went onto compete at the 2009 Summer Deaflympics and clinched gold medal in the women's singles event. In the 2013 Summer Deaflympics, which was her last Deaflympic appearance claimed silver medal in the women's singles event after becoming runners-up to Jung-Yu Fan.

Gergana Baramova also claimed silver medal in the women's doubles at the 2007 World Deaf Badminton Championships and also secured a bronze medal in the women's singles as a part of the 2011 World Deaf Badminton Championships.

References

External links 
 
 
 Profile at Deaflympics

1989 births
Living people
Bulgarian female badminton players
Deaf badminton players
Bulgarian deaf people